Jo Vannicola (born 20 April 1968), formerly known as Joanne Vannicola, is a Canadian actor. They are most noted for their roles as Dr. Naadiah in Being Erica, Dr. Mia Stone in PSI Factor, Jerri in Love and Human Remains, Sam in Stonewall, Renee in Slasher: Guilty Party, Amber Ciotti in Slasher: Solstice and Slasher: Flesh and Blood, as well as voice roles in Crash Canyon and My Dad the Rock Star.

Vannicola came out as non-binary in their 2019 memoir All We Knew But Couldn't Say.

Background
Born in Montreal, Quebec, Vannicola began her career as a child, and moved to Toronto, Ontario in her teens to attend the Toronto School for the Performing Arts.

Career
Vannicola had their first prominent role in the teen drama series 9B, for which they received a Gemini Award nomination for Best Actress in a Continuing Dramatic Role in 1989. In 1991, they won an Emmy Award for Outstanding Performance in a Children's Special in Maggie's Secret, and in 1994 they received a Genie Award nomination for Best Supporting Actress for the film Love and Human Remains.

Vannicola has also appeared in films and television series such as Common Ground, Girlfriends' Guide to Divorce, Rookie Blue, Slasher, Degrassi, Stardom, Betrayal of Silence, The Ultimate Betrayal, Relic Hunter, Mutant X, Kung Fu: The Legend Continues, Night Heat and Derby. In 2019, they appeared in the Street Legal reboot as Sam, a non-binary supporting character who was planned to have a more prominent storyline in the second season, although the reboot was cancelled after six episodes.

Joanne received an ACTRA Award nomination for Best Voice Performance in 2009.

They wrote and directed their first short film, SNIP, in 2017.

In 2019, Vannicola published their memoir, All We Knew But Couldn't Say, with Dundurn Press.

Personal life
Vannicola founded a non-profit organization to raise awareness about child abuse, Youth Out Loud, in 2004. An out lesbian prior to coming out as non-binary, Vannicola was a prominent campaigner for same-sex marriage in Canada and is the current chair of outACTRAto, ACTRA's advocacy and support committee for LGBTQ performers.

Vannicola holds a certificate from the creative writing program at University of Toronto, and was selected for the Diaspora Dialogues program in Toronto in 2013.

Filmography

Film

Television

Voice work

References

External links

1968 births
Actors from Montreal
Anglophone Quebec people
Canadian memoirists
Canadian television actors
Canadian voice actors
Canadian film actors
Living people
Canadian non-binary actors
Canadian non-binary writers
Canadian LGBT rights activists
Writers from Montreal
20th-century Canadian actors
21st-century Canadian actors
21st-century Canadian non-fiction writers
21st-century memoirists
21st-century Canadian LGBT people
20th-century Canadian LGBT people